John Levell Starks (born August 10, 1965) is an American former professional basketball player who was a shooting guard in the National Basketball Association (NBA). He was undrafted in the 1988 NBA draft after attending four colleges in his native Oklahoma, including Oklahoma State University. Starks was named an NBA All-Star while playing for the New York Knicks in the 1990s.

Early life
Starks was born in Tulsa, Oklahoma where he attended Tulsa Central High School. At Tulsa Central, Starks played only one year on the basketball team.

After high school, he enrolled at Rogers State College in 1984. While at Rogers State, Starks was on the "taxi squad" of the basketball team for backups to replace injured or suspended players; taxi squad players did not suit up and instead watched games from the stands. However, Starks was expelled from Rogers State for stealing another student's stereo equipment in retaliation for the student breaking into Starks' dorm room and the college holding him and his roommates financially responsible for the damage. Starks transferred to Northern Oklahoma College in spring 1985, made the basketball team there, and was sentenced to five days in jail for the robbery. He served the sentence during spring break. In the fall of 1985, Starks averaged 11 points per game with Northern Oklahoma but left the college after being caught smoking cannabis in his dorm. Having worked at a Safeway supermarket, Starks enrolled at Tulsa Junior College in the summer of 1986 to pursue a business degree. While playing intramural basketball, he came to the attention of Ken Trickey, the former coach of Oral Roberts University who was then starting a basketball program for Oklahoma Junior College. Starks played there for a season, then earned a scholarship at Oklahoma State University in 1988, where he finished his collegiate career.

Career

Golden State Warriors 
Undrafted in the 1988 NBA draft, Starks signed with the Golden State Warriors in September 1988 as a free agent. However, as the Warriors had drafted fellow shooting guard Mitch Richmond with the fifth overall pick that year, Starks played limited minutes in only 36 games while Richmond won Rookie of the Year.

Other Leagues 
Starks played stints in the Continental Basketball Association (Cedar Rapids Silver Bullets, 1989–90) and World Basketball League (Memphis Rockers, 1990–91).

New York Knicks 

In 1990, Starks tried out for the New York Knicks. In one practice, he tried to dunk on Knicks center Patrick Ewing. Ewing threw him down and Starks twisted his knee. The team was not allowed to release him unless it healed by the end of December. When it did not heal by that time, the Knicks could not release him. As a result, Starks has referred to Ewing as his saving grace. Starks eventually became the starting shooting guard, becoming a key player on the team and playing eight seasons in New York from 1990 to 1998. Starks was a posterchild for their physical play during that era, along with teammates Anthony Mason and Charles Oakley. He was a participant in the 1992 NBA Slam Dunk Contest.

Starks executed one of the most famous plays in Knicks history, a play that became known simply as "The Dunk". In Game 2 of the 1993 Eastern Conference Finals against the Chicago Bulls, Starks was in the court's right corner, and closely guarded by B. J. Armstrong. Ewing came to set a screen for Starks, who faked to the left, as if to exploit the screen, but then drove along the baseline and, with his left hand, dunked over Horace Grant.

One of the low points of Starks' career came in the 1994 NBA Finals against the Houston Rockets. In the closing seconds of Game 3 and the Knicks trailing by three, Starks was fouled by Rockets center Hakeem Olajuwon while attempting a three-pointer. At the time, the NBA allowed only two free throws during a foul on a three-pointer. Starks made both, but Houston won 93–89 (the league would change the rule to allow three free throws the next season). Starks and the Knicks then watched their home court host the New York Rangers' first Stanley Cup celebration in 54 years, with their 3–2 win over the Vancouver Canucks in Game 7 of the 1994 Stanley Cup Finals. It served as an inspiration for the Knicks to recover to take a 3–2 series lead going into Game 6. However, in the final seconds of Game 6, Olajuwon blocked Starks' last-second 3-point attempt to give Houston an 86–84 victory. In Game 7, Starks had one of the worst games of his career, shooting 2-for-18 from the field, including 1-for-10 in the fourth quarter. The Rockets went on to win the game and the championship.

In 1995, Starks became the first player to hit 200 three pointers in a single season. In the offseason, Pat Riley left the Knicks to go to the Miami Heat after a dispute with then General Manager Dave Checketts. The Knicks hired Don Nelson, bringing back the tensions from Starks' first season in Golden State. Nelson started Hubert Davis over Starks. Nelson was eventually fired mid-season, and the Knicks replaced him with Jeff Van Gundy. In 1996 Allan Houston took Starks' starting spot. Starks was a steady contributor off the bench and won the NBA Sixth Man of the Year award in 1997.

On February 18, 1997, Starks hit a buzzer-beating three-pointer to defeat the Phoenix Suns at home 95–94. On the play, he rebounded an Allan Houston missed three while getting to the three-point line and head-faked the Suns Wesley Person before releasing the shot just as the horn sounded. Replays were inconclusive as to whether the shot was released in time, but the basket stood. This may have been the most dramatic regular season moment of Starks' career, as it was his only buzzer beater to win an NBA game.

Return to Golden State 
In January 1999, Starks was traded back to his original team, the Golden State Warriors. Starks was traded along with Chris Mills and Terry Cummings in exchange for Latrell Sprewell. Starks remained with the Warriors until February 2000, when he was traded to the Chicago Bulls as part of a three-team trade.

Chicago Bulls 
Starks played for the Chicago Bulls for 4 games in the 1999–2000 season.

Utah Jazz 
Starks finished his career with the Utah Jazz, playing for the Jazz from 2000–01 to 2001–02.

Later career and retirement
After his stint with Golden State, Starks played for the Chicago Bulls and Utah Jazz before failing to make an NBA team in 2002 and retiring with 10,829 career points. He currently works for the Knicks as an alumnus and fan development official, and as a pre-and-post-game analyst on MSG Network's home Knicks game coverage. He has also served as the head coach of the Maulers, a Slamball team. He was head coach of the Westchester Wildfire during the 2003 United States Basketball League season. His autobiography, John Starks: My Life, was published in 2004.

Starks is part-owner and a promoter for the Ektio basketball shoe, which doctor and former college basketball player Barry Katz designed to reduce ankle injuries.

John Starks owns a Kia dealership, John Starks Kia, in the Briarwood neighborhood of Jamaica, NY.

Slamball coaching record

Legacy
His tenacity, desire to win, and plays like "The Dunk", made Starks into a great crowd favorite in New York. Despite not being a perennial all-star, Starks is generally considered one of the greatest Knicks in history. Starks' fiery intensity often led to emotional displays on the court. Reggie Miller, star shooting guard for the Indiana Pacers, was often a provocateur and target of his ire; during game three of the 1993 NBA Playoffs, Starks was ejected for headbutting Miller.

Starks is the Knicks' all-time leader in three point field goals (982). He was the first player in NBA history to make 200 three-pointers in one season; his 217 during the 1994–95 NBA season broke Louie Dampier's single-season professional (NBA or ABA) record of 199 during the 1968–69 ABA season. Dennis Scott broke Starks' record a year later with 267; it now belongs to Stephen Curry.

Despite his relatively short height, Starks was, like his teammates Charles Oakley and Patrick Ewing, an apt defender on the 1990s defensive-minded New York Knicks, which employed a physical No Lay-Up Defense under head coach Pat Riley. Starks was named to the NBA All-Defensive Second Team once, in 1992–93.

Starks is mentioned by surname in A Tribe Called Quest's song "8 Million Stories" on Midnight Marauders and in Beastie Boys’ “Get It Together” off Ill Communication.

Personal life
Starks' mother was one-quarter Muscogee.

On December 13, 1986, John Starks married his wife Jackie. They have one son and two daughters.

NBA career statistics

Regular season 

|-
| style="text-align:left;"| 
| align="left" | Golden State
| 36 ||0 ||8.8 ||.408 ||.385 ||.654 ||1.1 ||.8 ||.6 ||.1 ||4.1
|-
| align="left" | 
| align="left" | New York
| 61 ||10 ||19.2 ||.439 ||.290 ||.752 ||2.1 ||3.3 ||1.0 ||.3 ||7.6
|-
| align="left" | 
| align="left" | New York
| 82 ||0 ||25.8 ||.449 ||.348 ||.778 ||2.3 ||3.4 ||1.3 ||.2 ||13.9
|-
| align="left" | 
| align="left" | New York
| 80 ||51 ||31.0 ||.428 ||.321 ||.795 ||2.6 ||5.1 ||1.1 ||.2 ||17.5
|-
| align="left" | 
| align="left" | New York
| 59 ||54 ||34.9 ||.420 ||.335 ||.754 ||3.1 ||5.9|| 1.6 ||.1 ||19.0
|-
| align="left" | 
| align="left" | New York
| 80 ||78 ||34.1 ||.395 ||.355 ||.737 ||2.7 ||5.1 ||1.2 ||.1 ||15.3
|-
| align="left" | 
| align="left" | New York
| 81 ||71 ||30.8 ||.443 ||.361 ||.753 ||2.9 ||3.9 ||1.3 ||.1 ||12.6
|-
| align="left" | 
| align="left" | New York
| 77 ||1 ||26.5 ||.431 ||.369 ||.769 ||2.7 ||2.8 ||1.2 ||.1 ||13.8
|-
| align="left" | 
| align="left" | New York
| 82 ||10 ||26.7 ||.393 ||.327 ||.787 ||2.8 ||2.7 ||1.0 ||.1 ||12.9
|-
| align="left" | 
| align="left" | Golden State
| 50 ||50 ||33.7 ||.370 ||.290 ||.740 ||3.3 ||4.7 ||1.4 ||.1 ||13.8
|-
| align="left" | 
| align="left" | Golden State
| 33 ||30 ||33.6 ||.378 ||.348 ||.833 ||2.8 ||5.2 ||1.1 ||.1 ||14.7
|-
| align="left" | 
| align="left" | Chicago
| 4 || 0 || 20.5 || .324 || .300 ||1.000 || 2.5 || 2.8 || 1.3 || .3 || 7.5
|-
| align="left" | 
| align="left" | Utah
| 75 ||64 ||28.3 ||.398 ||.352 ||.802 ||2.1 ||2.4 ||1.0 ||.1 ||9.3
|-
| align="left" | 
| align="left" | Utah
| 66 ||1 ||14.1 ||.368 ||.305 ||.805 ||1.0 ||1.1 ||1.0 ||.0 ||4.4
|- class="sortbottom"
| style="text-align:center;" colspan="2"| Career
| 866 ||420 ||27.2 ||.412 ||.340 ||.769 ||2.5 ||3.6 ||1.1 ||.1 ||12.9
|- class="sortbottom"
| style="text-align:center;" colspan="2"| All-Star
| 1 || 0 || 20.0 || .444 || .333 || - || 3.0 || 3.0 || 1.0 || 0.0 || 9.0

Playoffs 

|-
|style="text-align:left;"|1991
|style="text-align:left;"|New York
|3||0||9.3||.400||-||1.000||1.0||2.0||.0||.0||2.0
|-
|style="text-align:left;"|1992
|style="text-align:left;"|New York
|12||0||24.6||.374||.239||.808||2.5||3.2||1.4||.0||12.1
|-
|style="text-align:left;"|1993
|style="text-align:left;"|New York
|15||15||38.3||.440||.373||.717||3.5||6.4||1.0||.2||16.5
|-
|style="text-align:left;"|1994
|style="text-align:left;"|New York
|25||18||33.6||.381||.356||.770||2.3||4.6||1.4||.1||14.6
|-
|style="text-align:left;"|1995
|style="text-align:left;"|New York
|11||11||34.5||.450||.411||.619||2.3||5.2||1.2||.1||15.6
|-
|style="text-align:left;"|1996
|style="text-align:left;"|New York
|8||8||39.3||.448||.467||.744||3.6||4.1||1.6||.1||16.0
|-
|style="text-align:left;"|1997
|style="text-align:left;"|New York
|9||1||28.1||.444||.317||.806||3.4||2.8||1.1||.0||14.0
|-
|style="text-align:left;"|1998
|style="text-align:left;"|New York
|10||2||31.4||.472||.424||.875||4.0||2.3||1.6||.1||16.4
|-
|style="text-align:left;"|2001
|style="text-align:left;"|Utah
|3||0||12.0||.333||.250||1.000||1.0||.3||.3||.3||3.7
|- class="sortbottom"
| style="text-align:center;" colspan="2"| Career
| 96 || 55 || 31.6 || .421 || .371 || .759 || 2.8 || 4.1 || 1.3 || .1 || 14.2

Publications

See also
List of National Basketball Association career playoff 3-point scoring leaders
Knicks–Heat rivalry
Bulls–Knicks rivalry

References

External links 

John Starks Foundation

1965 births
Living people
African-American basketball players
American people convicted of robbery
Basketball players from Oklahoma
Cedar Rapids Silver Bullets players
Central High School (Tulsa, Oklahoma) alumni
Chicago Bulls players
Golden State Warriors players
Northern Oklahoma Mavericks men's basketball players
Muscogee people
National Basketball Association All-Stars
Native American basketball players
New York Knicks players
Oklahoma State Cowboys basketball players
Shooting guards
Sportspeople from Tulsa, Oklahoma
Undrafted National Basketball Association players
Utah Jazz players
American men's basketball players
American people of Muscogee descent
United States Basketball League coaches
21st-century African-American people
20th-century African-American sportspeople